Norman Fiering (born 1935 in New York City) is an American historian, and Director and Librarian, Emeritus, of the John Carter Brown Library.

Life
He graduated from Dartmouth College in 1956, where he was a student of Eugen Rosenstock-Huessy, and from Columbia University with a Ph.D. in 1969.

He taught at Stanford University between 1964 and 1969, and was a post-doctoral fellow for three years at the Institute of Early American History and Culture in Williamsburg, Virginia, 1969-1972. In 1972 he was appointed Editor of Publications at the Institute. From 1983 to 2006, he was Director and Librarian of the John Carter Brown Library at Brown University.

Awards

 Omohundro Institute of Early American History and Culture Fellowship
 1975-76 National Endowment for the Humanities Fellowship
 1978-79 National Humanities Center Fellowship in Research Triangle Park, North Carolina
 1983 Merle Curti Award

Bibliography

Books
 Moral Philosophy at Seventeenth-Century Harvard: A Discipline in Transition, University of North Carolina Press. 1981
 Jonathan Edwards's Moral Thought and Its British Context, University of North Carolina Press. 1981
 A Guide to Book Publication for Historians (Washington, D. C.: American Historical Assn.), 1979, pamphlet, 40 pp.

Articles
 "President Samuel Johnson and the Circle of Knowledge," William and Mary Quarterly, XXVIII (April 1971), 199-236.
 "Solomon Stoddard's Library at Harvard in 1664," Harvard Library Bulletin (July 1972), 255-269.
 "Will and Intellect in the New England Mind," William and Mary Quarterly, XXIX (Oct. 1972), 515-558. (Best article award, William and Mary Quarterly, 1972).
 "A Reply to George Steiner," Visible Language, VI (Summer, 1972), 218-222.
 "Irresistible Compassion: An Aspect of Eighteenth-Century Sympathy and Humanitarianism," Journal of the History of Ideas, XXXVII (April 1976), 195-218.
 "Editing the Historian's First Book," The Maryland Historian, VII (Spring 1976), 61-69.
 "The Transatlantic Republic of Letters: A Note on the Circulation of Learned Periodicals to Early Eighteenth-Century America," William and Mary Quarterly, XXXIII (Oct. 1976), 642-660.
 "Early American Philosophy vs. Philosophy in Early America," Transactions of the Charles S. Peirce Society, XIII (Summer 1977), 216-237.
 "Benjamin Franklin and the Way to Virtue," American Quarterly, XXX (July 1978), 199-223.
 "The First American Enlightenment: Tillotson, Leverett, and Philosophical Anglicanism," New England Quarterly, LIV (Sept. 1981), 307-334. (Winner of the Walter Muir Whitehill Prize, Col. Society of Massachusetts).
 "Comment on Thomas Tanselle's, 'The Bibliography and Textual Study of American Books," American Antiquarian Society Proceedings, XCV, Part I (Worcester, Mass.), 1985, 152-160.
 "The Rationalist Foundations of Jonathan Edwards's Metaphysics," in Nathan O. Hatch and Harry S. Stout, Jonathan Edwards and the American Experience (Oxford U. Press, 1989)  
 "Philosophy" in the three-volume Encyclopedia of the North American Colonies, ed. Jacob E. Cooke (New York, 1993).

Edited

References

External links
"Author's website"
"The New England Mind Revisited", Virginia Quarterly Review, Philip F. Gura, Summer 1982
"Interview with Norman Fiering", Daniel J. Slive, RBM: A Journal of Rare Books, Manuscripts, and Cultural Heritage, VI, no. 2 (Fall 2005), pp. 124-140.
 "'Tremendous Satisfaction from Helping People to Pursue Their Research,' An Interview with Norman Fiering," Jaap Jacobs, Itinerario, XXVIII, no. 2 (2004), pp. 7–13

1935 births
Dartmouth College alumni
Columbia University alumni
Stanford University Department of History faculty
Brown University faculty
Living people
American librarians
21st-century American historians
20th-century American historians
American male non-fiction writers
20th-century American male writers